The Mandarin Oriental, Macau is a luxury hotel on Avenida Dr. Sun Yat-sen in Sé, Macau, Special administrative regions of China. The hotel overlooks the Outer Harbour and Nam Van Lake, and is part of the One Central development connected to the MGM Macau and immediately to the south of the Wynn Macau. The Mandarin Oriental has 213 rooms and is managed by Mandarin Oriental Hotel Group.

The hotel opened on 29 June 2010. Despite being in Macau, the property does not have a casino so as to differentiate itself and provide a non-gaming alternative to guests and is the only non-gaming five-star hotel in Macau. The hotel is described by Lonely Planet as a "refreshing alternative" to the many casino hotels of the city.

The property also features 92 residences and serviced apartments, located on the fifteen floors above the hotel.

References

Mandarin Oriental Hotel Group
Hotels in Macau
2010 establishments in Macau
Hotel buildings completed in 2010
Sé, Macau